George Skutt (died December 1653) was an English merchant and politician who served as Member of Parliament for Poole. He was excluded in Pride's Purge during the English Civil War.

References 

1653 deaths
English MPs 1640–1648
People from Poole